Briesemeister Peak is a peak,  high, which stands  west-northwest of Cape Rymill on the east coast of Palmer Land. This peak was photographed from the air by Sir Hubert Wilkins on December 20, 1928, and by the United States Antarctic Service in 1940. It was named by the Ronne Antarctic Research Expedition under Finn Ronne, 1947–48, after William A. Briesemeister (died 1967), Chief Cartographer of the American Geographical Society, 1913–63, who by recognizing this peak on two photographs taken by Wilkins established their continuity, an important clue to the identity and correct position of Stefansson Strait; he supervised the preparation of maps of Antarctica for use during the International Geophysical Year (IGY) (1957–58) and post-IGY programs of the United States Antarctic Research Program, including continental maps published at a scale of 1:6,000,000 (1956) and 1:5,000,000 (1962).

References 

Mountains of Palmer Land